Brdo is a settlement in western Slovenia in the Municipality of Nova Gorica. It is located in the Vipava Valley, near the village of Dornberk.

References

External links
Brdo on Geopedia

Populated places in the City Municipality of Nova Gorica